Kaj Hansen (16 August 1940 – 2 July 2009) was a Danish former footballer, who spent the majority of his career with Boldklubben Frem. He played seven games for the Denmark national football team, and represented his country at the 1964 UEFA European Football Championship. He was born in Copenhagen and died in Sweden.

External links
Danish national team profile
 Boldklubben Frem profile

1940 births
2009 deaths
Footballers from Copenhagen
Danish men's footballers
Danish expatriate men's footballers
Denmark under-21 international footballers
Denmark international footballers
Boldklubben Frem players
Helsingborgs IF players
1964 European Nations' Cup players
Washington Whips players
North American Soccer League (1968–1984) players
Expatriate soccer players in the United States
Expatriate footballers in Sweden
Association football defenders
Danish expatriate sportspeople in the United States
Danish expatriate sportspeople in Sweden